Guido Sala (15 December 1928 – 13 April 1987) was an Italian Grand Prix motorcycle road racer and world champion kart racer. His best year in Grand Prix motorcycle racing was in 1954 when he won the 125cc Nations Grand Prix and finished seventh in the world championship.

He later switched to kart racing, winning the first-ever FIA Karting World Championship in 1964, and repeating as champion in 1965.

Motorcycle Grand Prix results

Bold = Pole position 

Italic = Fastest lap

References 

1928 births
Italian motorcycle racers
125cc World Championship riders
Karting World Championship drivers
1987 deaths
People from Lissone